"Looking Tragic" and "Begging for Trouble" are two songs released as a joint single by American rock band AFI. The songs were released on February 25, 2021, as the second joint single for the band's 11th album, Bodies.

Background 
AFI guitarist, Jade Puget, revealed that the band had completed writing Bodies in April of 2020, but that they had chosen to push back the release due to the COVID-19 pandemic. Shortly after its release, the band detailed the meaning of "Looking Tragic" on their Twitter account with a quote from the band's frontman, Davey Havok:"Looking Tragic" addresses the theme of overstimulation resulting in desensitization. Melodic and driving, the song came to life quickly and immediately stood out as a track to make bodies, if not sentiments, move.Additionally, drummer, Adam Carson, gave details on the writing process for "Begging for Trouble":After years of receiving early versions of songs from Jade and Davey, in forms that span loosely arranged chords and scratch vocal to fully realised demos, I think I have become quite adept at knowing which songs will or will not make the record. "Begging for Trouble" was greenlit, at least in my mind, the moment I heard the vocals come in. To me, the track is a cornerstone of the new record.

Release and reception 
AFI began to tease new music the day before the single came out. The single was announced alongside both the release date for Bodies, and a new music video for "Looking Tragic". The video shows the band playing the song in a vibrantly colored room while continuously being covered in multicolored streamers.

Track listing 

 Digital download

 "Looking Tragic" – 2:37
 "Begging for Trouble" – 2:20

Personnel 
AFI

 Davey Havok – vocals, songwriting
 Jade Puget – guitar, songwriting, producer
 Hunter Burgan – bass guitar, songwriting
 Adam Carson – drums, songwriting

Production

 Jeremy Lubsey – assistant mastering
 Mike Fasano – instrument technician
 Paul Fig – mixing
 Tony Hoffer – mixing
 Vlado Meller – mixing

References 

2021 songs
2021 singles
AFI (band) songs
Rise Records singles
Songs written by Hunter Burgan
Songs written by Adam Carson
Songs written by Davey Havok
Songs written by Jade Puget